Events in the year 2005 in Hong Kong.

Incumbents
 Chief Executive: Tung Chee-hwa (until 12 March); Donald Tsang (from 21 June)

Events

September
 12 September – Hong Kong Disneyland opened to visitors at 13:00 (HKT).

See also
 List of Hong Kong films of 2005

References

 
Years of the 21st century in Hong Kong
Hong Kong
Hong Kong